The 2017–18 season was the 117th season in Società Sportiva Lazio's history and their 30th consecutive season in the top-flight of Italian football. Lazio competed in Serie A, the Coppa Italia and the Europa League.

Players

Squad information

Transfers

In

Loans in

Out

Loans out

Pre-season and friendlies

Competitions

Supercoppa Italiana

Serie A

League table

Results summary

Results by round

Matches

Coppa Italia

UEFA Europa League

Group stage

Knockout phase

Round of 32

Round of 16

Quarter-finals

Statistics

Appearances and goals

|-
! colspan=14 style="background:#B2FFFF; text-align:center"| Goalkeepers

|-
! colspan=14 style="background:#B2FFFF; text-align:center"| Defenders

|-
! colspan=14 style="background:#B2FFFF; text-align:center"| Midfielders

|-
! colspan=14 style="background:#B2FFFF; text-align:center"| Forwards

|-
! colspan=14 style="background:#B2FFFF; text-align:center"| Players transferred out during the season

Goalscorers

Last updated: 20 May 2018

Clean sheets

Last updated: 20 May 2018

Disciplinary record

Last updated: 20 May 2018

References

S.S. Lazio seasons
Lazio
Lazio